The Express-Times is a daily newspaper based in Easton, Pennsylvania. The newspaper provides national news and extensive local news coverage of the Lehigh Valley region of eastern Pennsylvania. Founded in 1855, The Express-Times is the longest continuously published newspaper in the Lehigh Valley.

The paper has won awards in both New Jersey and Pennsylvania. In 2021, it won the Toner Prize for Excellence in Political Reporting.

History
First printed 1855 as The Easton Daily Express, the name changed to The Easton Express in 1917 and was abbreviated to The Express in 1973. In 1991, The Express merged with The Globe-Times of Bethlehem to become The Express-Times.

Thomson Newspapers bought The Express of Easton in 1983. The paper took on its current name when the Globe-Times of Bethlehem, Pennsylvania merged with The Express. MediaNews Group bought The Express-Times from Thomson in 1994. Current owner Advance Publications bought MediaNews' New Jersey and Pennsylvania newspapers in 2000.

The Express-Times is also available online at lehighvalleylive.com.

Distribution
The Express-Times publishes zoned editions in the Lehigh Valley and New Jersey. It delivers to Lehigh and Northampton Counties in Pennsylvania and Warren and Hunterdon Counties in northwest New Jersey.

Sections
The Express-Times has four editorial sections:
Front: Local, national and world news
Valley: Local news and obituaries from the Lehigh Valley
Sports: Local and national sports
Today: Local and national arts & entertainment
Editorials, classifieds, comics, horoscopes and puzzles also appear daily.

Inserts
The following are inserted into The Express-Times during the week:
Friday:  Exposed, an entertainment tabloid
Saturday: Real Estate, a real estate guide
Sunday: Sunday Morning, a features section, including news from The Wall Street Journal, and full color comics.

Other publications
The Express-Times also publishes a weekly, The US, based in Nazareth, Pennsylvania.

See also
Media in the Lehigh Valley

References

External links
Official website

1855 establishments in Pennsylvania
Advance Publications
Daily newspapers published in Pennsylvania
Easton, Pennsylvania
Media in the Lehigh Valley
Publications established in 1855